This article contains information about the literary events and publications of 1913.

Events
January – Acmeist poetry, with roots back to 1909, is officially born as a reaction to Russian Futurism. Manifestos are printed in the journal Apollon by Nikolay Gumilyov and Sergey Gorodetsky, with illustrative works by both, and by Anna Akhmatova, Vladimir Narbut, and Osip Mandelstam — the last with "Hagia Sophia".
January 1 – The German National Library is founded in Leipzig.
January 8 – Harold Monro founds the Poetry Bookshop in London, which becomes a noted literary meeting-place.
January 24 – Franz Kafka stops working on his novel Amerika, which he never finishes.
March 24 – New Broadway theatre Palace Theatre opens at 1564 Broadway (at West 47th Street) in midtown Manhattan, New York City.
April 5 – Serialization of the adventures of Gaston Leroux's character Chéri-Bibi begins in Le Matin (France).
April – Bernhard Kellermann's novel Der Tunnel sells 100,000 copies in its first six months.
c. April – Humphrey S. Milford becomes publisher to the University of Oxford and head of the London operations of Oxford University Press, after the retirement of Henry Frowde.
September – F. Scott Fitzgerald enters Princeton University, where he meets Edmund Wilson and John Peale Bishop.
November 8 – Georg Büchner's play Woyzeck, unfinished on his death in 1837, receives its first performance at the Residenztheater, Munich.
November 13 – Marcel Proust's Swann's Way (Du côté de chez Swann), volume 1 of In Search of Lost Time (À la recherche du temps perdu), is published by Éditions Grasset in Paris at the author's expense.
December 21 – Arthur Wynne's "word-cross", the first crossword puzzle, appears in the New York World.
December 26 – Ambrose Bierce, an observer with Pancho Villa's army in the Mexican Revolution, sends his last known correspondence. He is never seen again.
unknown dates
Zaynab, by Husayn Haykal, is published; it is sometimes called the first modern Arabic novel.
Norbert von Hellingrath begins publishing his edition of Friedrich Hölderlin's complete works (Sämtliche Werke: historisch-kritische Ausgabe, the "Berliner Ausgabe"), restoring it to literary prominence.
Henri Stahl publishes excerpts from his novel Un român în lună ("A Romanian on the Moon", republished as a book in 1914), one of the earliest works of Romanian science fiction.

New books

Fiction
Alain-Fournier – Le Grand Meaulnes
Maurice Barrès – The Sacred Hill
Andrei Bely – Petersburg (Петербургъ, Peterburg) - Serialization concludes in March 1914
Arnold Bennett – The Regent
E. F. Benson 
Dodo's Daughter
Thorley Weir
The Weaker Vessel
Edmund Clerihew Bentley – Trent's Last Case
Algernon Blackwood – A Prisoner in Fairyland
Victor Bridges – Another Man's Shoes
Ivana Brlić-Mažuranić – The Brave Adventures of Lapitch (Čudnovate zgode šegrta Hlapića)
Mary Grant Bruce – Norah of Billabong
John Buchan – The Power-House (serialization)
Edgar Rice Burroughs – The Return of Tarzan
Hall Caine – The Woman Thou Gavest Me
Ethel Carnie – Miss Nobody
Willa Cather – O Pioneers!
Joseph Conrad – Chance (book publication)
Miguel de Unamuno – El espejo de la muerte (The Mirror of Death, stories)
Grazia Deledda – Canne al vento (Reeds in the Wind)
Ethel M. Dell – The Knave of Diamonds
Arthur Conan Doyle – The Poison Belt
Roger Martin du Gard – Jean Barois
Edna Ferber – Roast Beef, Medium
Ellen Glasgow – Virginia
Elinor Glyn 
The Sequence
The Contrast and Other Stories
Frances Nimmo Greene — The Right of the Strongest
Knut Hamsun – Børn av TidenHusayn Haykal – ZaynabFranz Hessel – Der Kramladen des GlücksRobert Hichens – The Way of AmbitionHenry James – A Small Boy and OthersAnnie Fellows Johnston – Miss Santa Clause of the PullmanMary Johnston – HagarBernhard Kellermann – Der TunnelValery Larbaud – A. O. BarnaboothD. H. Lawrence – Sons and LoversGaston Leroux – The Secret of the NightJack London The Valley of the MoonThe Abysmal BruteMarie Belloc Lowndes 
 The End of Her Honeymoon The LodgerArnold Lunn – The HarroviansCompton Mackenzie – Sinister Street, vol. 1
Katherine Mansfield – "Millie" (short story)
Patricio Mariano – Ang Tala sa Panghulo (The Bright Star at Panghulo)
Flora Mayor – The Third Miss SymonsOscar Micheaux – Conquest: The Story of a Negro PioneerOctave Mirbeau – DingoLucy Maud Montgomery – The Golden RoadMori Ōgai (森 鷗外) – The Wild Geese (雁, Gan, serialization concludes December)
E. Phillips Oppenheim – The Double Life of Mr. Alfred BurtonBaroness Orczy – EldoradoLuigi Pirandello – I vecchi e i giovani (The Old and the Young, complete)
N. Porsenna – La judecata Zeilor (A Tribunal of Gods)
Marcel Proust – Swann's Way (Du côté de chez Swann, first part of À la Recherche du temps perdu)
Sax Rohmer – The Mystery of Dr. Fu-ManchuSaki – When William CameEwald Gerhard Seeliger – Peter Voss, Thief of MillionsGene Stratton-Porter – LaddieBooth Tarkington – The FlirtVincent Cartwright Vickers – The Google Book Edgar Wallace 
 The Fourth Plague Grey Timothy The River of StarsHugh Walpole – FortitudeMary Augusta WardThe Coryston FamilyThe Mating of LydiaEdith Wharton – The Custom of the CountryP. G. Wodehouse – The Little NuggetLeonard Woolf – The Village in the JungleFrancis Brett Young – UndergrowthChildren and young people
L. Frank Baum The Patchwork Girl of OzLittle Wizard Stories of OzAunt Jane's Nieces on the Ranch (as Edith Van Dyne)
Ivana Brlić-Mažuranić – The Brave Adventures of Lapitch (Čudnovate zgode šegrta Hlapića)Gertrude Minnie Faulding – FairiesFerenc Móra – Csilicsali Csalavári Csalavér (nonsense title, about a wolf family)
E. Nesbit – Wet MagicEleanor H. Porter – PollyannaBeatrix Potter – The Tale of Pigling BlandElse Ury – Nesthäkchen and Her Dolls (Nesthäkchen und ihre Puppen)Drama
Franz Arnold and Ernst Bach – The Spanish Fly (Die spanische Fliege)
Jacinto Benavente – The Unloved Woman (La malquerida)
 Arnold Bennett – The Great Adventure
George A. Birmingham – General John Regan
Montague Glass and Charles Klein – Potash and Perlmutter
A. de Herz
Păianjenul (The Spider)
Bunicul (Grandfather)
 Stanley Houghton 
 The Perfect Cure
 Trust the People
Victor Ido – Karinda Adinda
D. H. Lawrence – The Daughter-in-Law (first performed 1967)
Oskar Luts – Kapsapea (The Cabbage)
Gregorio Martínez Sierra
Mamá (Mama)
Sólo para mujeres (For Women Only)
Vladimir Mayakovsky – Vladimir Mayakovsky («Владимир Маяковский»)
Edward Sheldon – Romance
Carl Sternheim – Bürger Schippel (Citizen Schippel)

Poetry

Delmira Agustini – Los Cálices Vacíos (Empty Chalices)
Guillaume Apollinaire – AlcoolsJames Elroy Flecker – The Golden Journey to SamarkandRobert Frost – A Boy's WillOsip Mandelstam – Hagia SophiaSiegfried Sassoon – The Daffodil MurdererGeorg Trakl – Gedichte (Poems)

Non-fiction
Guillaume Apollinaire – The Cubist Painters, Aesthetic Meditations (Les Peintres Cubistes, Méditations Esthétiques)Miguel de Unamuno – Del sentimiento trágico de la vida (The Tragic Sense of Life)
Sigmund Freud – Totem und TabuMaxim Gorky – My Childhood (Детство) 
Holbrook Jackson – The Eighteen NinetiesWalter Lippmann – A Preface to PoliticsLuigi Russolo – The Art of Noises (L'arte dei rumori, Futurist manifesto)
Rosa Luxemburg – Die Akkumulation des Kapitals (The Accumulation of Capital, 1951)
Alfred North Whitehead and Bertrand Russell – Principia Mathematica (completed)
 Basil Williams – The Life of William Pitt, Earl of Chatham''

Births
January 23 – Joan Adeney Easdale, English poet (died 1998)
January 29 – Peter von Zahn, German journalist and writer (died 2001)
February 2 – Racey Helps, English children's writer and illustrator (died 1970)
February 26 – George Barker, British poet (died 1991)
February 27
 T. B. Ilangaratne, Sri Lankan author, dramatist, actor and politician (died 1992)
 Irwin Shaw, American playwright, screenwriter and novelist (died 1984)
March 2 – Godfried Bomans, Dutch writer (died 1971)
April 18 – Muttathu Varkey, Malayalam novelist, short story writer, and poet (died 1989) 
June 22 – Sándor Weöres, Hungarian poet and author (died 1989)
June 26 – Aimé Césaire, Martinique writer (died 2008)
July 6 – Gwyn Thomas, Welsh novelist (died 1981)
July 21 – Catherine Storr, English children's writer (died 2001)
August 11 – Angus Wilson, English novelist (died 1991)
August 28 – Robertson Davies, Canadian novelist (died 1995)
October 19 – Vasco Pratolini, Italian writer (died 1991)
November 7 – Albert Camus, French writer (died 1960)
November 10 – Karl Shapiro, American poet (died 2000)
December 26 – Elizabeth David (née Gwynne), English cookery writer (died 1992)
December 27 – Elizabeth Smart, Canadian poet and novelist (died 1986)

Deaths
January 21 – Aluísio Azevedo, Brazilian novelist, playwright and short story writer (born 1857)
February 9 – Oscar Méténier, French novelist and dramatist (born 1859)
February 13 – Charles Major, American novelist (born 1856)
March 7 – Pauline Johnson, Canadian poet (born 1861)
March 13
Thomas Krag, Norwegian novelist, dramatist and short story writer (born 1868)
Jane Marsh Parker, American novelist and religious writer (born 1836)
April 4 – Edward Dowden, Irish critic and poet (born 1843)
May 8 – Charlotte Louisa Hawkins Dempster, Scottish novelist and essayist (born 1835)
June 2 – Alfred Austin, English poet and Poet Laureate (born 1835)
June 13 – Camille Lemonnier, Belgian poet and journalist (born 1844)
July 8 – Louis Hémon, French novelist (rail accident, born 1880)
July 16 — Esther Saville Allen, American author (b. 1837)
October 9 – D. Iacobescu, Romanian poet (born 1893)
October 19 – Emily Lawless, Irish-born modernist novelist and poet (born 1845)
November 26 – Frances Julia Wedgwood, English feminist novelist, biographer and critic (born 1833)
December 1 – Juhan Liiv, Estonian poet and short story writer (born 1864)
December 5 – Ferdinand Dugué, French poet and playwright (born 1816)
December 11 – Ioan Kalinderu, Romanian classical scholar, jurist and agriculturalist (born 1840)

Awards
Nobel Prize for Literature: Rabindranath Tagore
Newdigate prize: Maurice Roy Ridley

References

 
Years of the 20th century in literature